Otryadyn Gündegmaa (born 23 May 1978), is a Mongolian sport shooter. She competed in 10 m and 25 m pistol events at the 1996, 2000, 2004, 2008 and 2012 Summer Olympics, and had her best results in the 25 pistol, winning a silver medal in 2008 and placing fifth-sixth in 1996–2004.

References

External links
 
Competition history

1978 births
Living people
ISSF pistol shooters
Shooters at the 1996 Summer Olympics
Shooters at the 2000 Summer Olympics
Shooters at the 2004 Summer Olympics
Shooters at the 2008 Summer Olympics
Shooters at the 2012 Summer Olympics
Shooters at the 2016 Summer Olympics
Olympic shooters of Mongolia
Mongolian female sport shooters
Olympic silver medalists for Mongolia
Sportspeople from Ulaanbaatar
Asian Games medalists in shooting
Olympic medalists in shooting
Medalists at the 2008 Summer Olympics
Shooters at the 1998 Asian Games
Shooters at the 2002 Asian Games
Shooters at the 2006 Asian Games
Shooters at the 2010 Asian Games
Shooters at the 2014 Asian Games
Asian Games silver medalists for Mongolia
Asian Games bronze medalists for Mongolia
Medalists at the 1998 Asian Games
Medalists at the 2002 Asian Games
Medalists at the 2006 Asian Games
Medalists at the 2010 Asian Games
Medalists at the 2014 Asian Games
Shooters at the 2018 Asian Games
Shooters at the 2020 Summer Olympics
21st-century Mongolian women